Thilak Raj (April 5, 1943 – May 7, 2021) was an Indian actor. Also known as Kalthoon Thilak, he was known for playing supporting roles in Tamil films as an antagonist. His breakthrough performance came in the film, Kalthoon (1981), following which he adapted the film's title in his stagename.

Career 
Thilak began his career in the Tamil film industry as an assistant editor at AVM Studios and had worked on 24 films. He began experimenting as an actor through appearances in Major Sundarrajan's drama troupe.

Thilak went on to act in over 70 films, including Thayilla Kuzhandhai (1976), Per Solla Oru Pillai (1978) and Aarilirunthu Arubathu Varai (1979), often appearing as arrogant villainous characters. In the latter, he portrayed the son of T. K. Bhagavathi's character, who ill treats the character portrayed by Rajinikanth. He garnered acclaim for his role in Sundarrajan's Kalthoon (1981), featuring as the son of Sivaji Ganesan and K. R. Vijaya's characters. In the 2010s, he worked as an actor in Tamil television serials.

Filmography 
Films

 Vellikizhamai Viratham (1974)
 Tiger Thathachari (1974)
 Apoorva Raagangal (1975)
 Thayilla Kuzhandhai (1976)
 Oru Oodhappu Kan Simittugiradhu (1976)
 Per Solla Oru Pillai (1978)
 Aarilirunthu Arubathu Varai (1979)
 Kalthoon (1981)
 Per Sollum Pillai (1987)
 Kai Naattu (1988)
 Aavathellam Pennale (1990)
 Velai Kidaichuduchu (1990)
 Adhikari (1991)

Television
Gopuram
Athipookkal

Death 
Thilak died of COVID-19 during the COVID-19 pandemic in Tamil Nadu in Chennai on 7 May 2021.

References 

1943 births
2021 deaths
Indian male film actors
Male actors in Tamil cinema
Tamil actors
Deaths from the COVID-19 pandemic in India